Morad Khan (also Romanized as Morād Khān; also known as Posht Tang-e Vosţá) is a village in Tarhan-e Sharqi Rural District, Tarhan District, Kuhdasht County, Lorestan Province, Iran. In the 2006 census, its population was 427, in 82 families.

References 

Towns and villages in Kuhdasht County